Robert A. Widenmann (January 24, 1852 – April 13, 1930) was a Deputy United States Marshal and associate of Billy the Kid during the Lincoln County War.

Early life 

Widenmann was born January 24, 1852, to German-born parents in Ann Arbor, Michigan. Widenmann's father was the Bavarian Consul in Ann Arbor. As a teen-ager, Widenmann was sent back to the family's native Germany for his schooling. He lived there for several years with a grandfather.

Returning to America in 1871, Widenmann settled in New York City, where he remained for two years before drifting west, finally arriving in Lincoln in mid-February 1877. In New Mexico, he would be appointed Deputy Marshal by U.S. Marshal for New Mexico Territory John Sherman Jr.

Lincoln County War 

On February 18, 1878, John Tunstall was killed, allegedly while resisting arrest, by Lincoln County Deputy Sheriffs William Morton, Frank Baker, Jesse Evans and Tom Hill. Tunstall had been accompanied by Robert Widenmann, Dick Brewer, Billy the Kid, John Middleton, Henry Newton Brown, and Fred Waite while driving horses from his ranch on the Rio Feliz to Lincoln.

On February 20, 1878, Sheriff William J. Brady, and his deputies arrested Billy the Kid and two other men riding with him. Three days later, Deputy U.S. Marshal Robert Widenmann, and a detachment of soldiers captured Sheriff Brady's jail guards, put them behind bars, and released the Kid and Brewer.

On March 9, 1878, New Mexico territorial Governor, Samuel Beach Axtell, issued a proclamation revoking Rob's appointment as Deputy Marshall.

On March 30, 1878, The Santa Fe New Mexican announced that U.S. Marshal John E. Sherman had reappointed Widenmann to the deputyship.

On April 1, 1878, Regulators Jim French, Frank McNab, John Middleton, Fred Waite, Henry Newton Brown and Billy the Kid ambushed Sheriff William J. Brady and four of his deputies on the main street of Lincoln. They fired on the five men from behind an adobe wall on John Tunstall's property. Brady died of at least a dozen gunshot wounds. Deputy Sheriff George W. Hindman was hit twice, fatally. Widenmann was present, but whether he participated was never ascertained: he claimed he was feeding Tunstall's dog at the time of the shooting. (When later asked at an inquiry why he was in possession of two pistols and a rifle, he replied that the dog was vicious).

Both Billy the Kid and Deputy Marshal Widenmann were pursued by the Lincoln County Sheriff's Department for their involvement in the deaths of Sheriff Brady and Deputy Hindman. Deputy Marshal Widenmann surrendered to the United States Army at Fort Stanton.

On April 4, 1878, Lieut. Col. Nathan Dudley assumed control of Fort Stanton and immediately released Rob and three others in default of legal documents.

On April 7, 1878, Rob and Marshal John E. Sherman Jr., arrested Jesse Evans, but within hours Dudley had procured warrants for Rob and seven others, who were now rearrested and held at the fort pending investigation in connection with the murder of Brady. Here they remained until 18 April, when a grand jury ordered the release of four, including Rob, and indicted the others.

On May 2, 1878, Rob, Alexander McSween, and seven others were incarcerated, this time by Sheriff John Copeland on Dudley's orders, only to be released two days later on lack of evidence.

On June 12, 1878, Rob left Lincoln for the last time, traveling under military escort to Mesilla, New Mexico to testify against Jesse Evans. This he did on 2 July.

Toward the end of September or the first week of October 1878, Widenmann, fearing for his life, fled the territory making his way east to ship out for London.

Later life 

Robert A. Widenmann's post-New Mexico career took him to Great Britain, where he visited Tunstall's family, and onto New York where in 1896 he was a National Democratic candidate for U.S. Representative from New York 17th District. He died in Haverstraw, N.Y. on April 13, 1930, at the age of 78.

According to his daughter Elsie, Widenmann lived in fear of his life for many years because of his role in the Lincoln county war and in bucking such powerful New Mexico politicians as Stephen B. Elkins.

See also 
 List of Western lawmen

References

1852 births
1930 deaths
Lawmen of the American Old West
Lincoln County Wars
People from Ann Arbor, Michigan
Police misconduct in the United States